The Dell Rapids Water Tower is a stone water tower located at 10th and Orleans Streets in Dell Rapids, South Dakota. The tower was built in 1894 to provide Dell Rapids with a civic water supply. The city decided to build the tower after an 1888 fire burned the south side of Main Street. The  water tower is built with Sioux quartzite, a type of red-pink rock found in southern South Dakota, southwest Minnesota, and northwest Iowa. The tower provided water to Dell Rapids until 1960, when the city constructed a new tower. It is the only stone water tower remaining in South Dakota.

The tower was added to the National Register of Historic Places on February 23, 1984.

References

Towers completed in 1894
Buildings and structures in Minnehaha County, South Dakota
Water towers in South Dakota
Water towers on the National Register of Historic Places in South Dakota
Infrastructure completed in 1894
National Register of Historic Places in Minnehaha County, South Dakota